This is a list of foreign Algerian Ligue Professionnelle 1 players. The Algerian Ligue Professionnelle 1, which began in its current guise in 1962, has been represented by 37 nations in total. foreign nations have been represented in the Algerian Ligue Professionnelle 1.



Angola

Benin

Bosnia-Herzegovina

Burundi

Brazil

Burkina Faso

Cape Verde

Cameroon

Comoros

Central African Republic

Congo

Congo DR

Chad

Djibouti

Egypt

Ethiopia

France

Gambia

Gabon

Ghana

Guinea

Iraq

Ivory Coast

Kenya

Lesotho

Liberia

Libya

Madagascar

Mali

Mauritania

Morocco

Niger

Nigeria

Portugal

Senegal

Togo

Tunisia

Uruguay

Venezuela

Yugoslavia

Foreign players with most appearances 
This table shows the ranking of the foreign players with most appearances of Algerian Ligue Professionnelle 1 since 1999–2000.

Bold Still playing in Algerian Ligue Professionnelle 1
Last update: As of 26 May 2019

Foreign players all-time top scorers 
This table shows the ranking of the foreign players All-time top scorers of Algerian Ligue Professionnelle 1 since 1999–2000.

Bold Still playing in Algerian Ligue Professionnelle 1
Last update: As of 19 May 2018

Number of players by country 
33 Cameroon
30 Mali
17 Burkina Faso
13 Ivory Coast
11 Nigeria
8 Niger
7 Tunisia
6 Congo
5 Ghana, Mauritania, Senegal, Guinea, France
4 Gabon, Chad, Benin
3 Brazil, Congo DR, Libya, Madagascar
2 Togo, Morocco, Kenya
1 Venezuela, Burundi, Uruguay, Portugal, Liberia, Lesotho, Iraq, Gambia, Egypt, Djibouti, Central African Republic, Cape Verde, Bosnia-Herzegovina, Angola, Comoros, Yugoslavia

References

 
Algerian Ligue Professionnelle 1
 
Association football player non-biographical articles